Manuel Orantes was the defending champion, but did not participate this year.

Željko Franulović won the title, defeating Victor Pecci Sr. 6–1, 6–1, 6–7, 7–5 in the final.

Seeds

  Jean-Louis Haillet (first round)
  Corrado Barazzutti (first round)

Draw

Final

Section 1

Section 2

External links
 1977 Romika Cup Singles draw

Singles